The following are the Binibining Pilipinas titleholders throughout the years, including the highlights of their performance in minor and Big Four international beauty pageants.

Titles 
Note that the year designates the time Binibining Pilipinas has acquired that particular pageant franchise.

Titleholders 
{| class="wikitable" style="text-align:center; font-size:95%; line-height:17px; width:100%;"
|-
! width:07%;" scope="col" | Year
! width:30%;" scope="col" | Winners
! width:20%;" scope="col" | Runners-Up
! width:30%;" scope="col" | International Placements
!width:03%;" scope="col" | Ref.
|-
!2022
|
Binibining Pilipinas International
Nicole Borromeo

Binibining Pilipinas Grand International
Roberta Angela Tamondong

Binibining Pilipinas Intercontinental
Gabrielle Camille Basiano

Binibining Pilipinas Globe
Chelsea Lovely Fernandez

|1st Runner-Up 
Herlene Nicole Budol

2nd Runner-Up
Stacey Daniella Gabriel
| style="background:#FFFF66;" | Miss International 2023
Nicole Borromeo (TBD)

Miss Grand International 2022 Roberta Angela Tamondong (5th Runner-Up)

Miss Intercontinental 2022
Gabrielle Camille Basiano (Top 20)

The Miss Globe 2022
Chelsea Lovely Fernandez (Top 15)

Miss Planet International 2022
Herlene Nicole Budol (Withdrew)

|
|-
!2021
|
Binibining Pilipinas International
Hannah Arnold

Binibining Pilipinas Grand International
Samantha Alexandra Panlilio

Binibining Pilipinas Intercontinental
Cinderella Faye Obeñita

Binibining Pilipinas Globe
Maureen Ann Montagne
|1st Runner-Up 
Gabrielle Camille Basiano

2nd Runner-Up
Meiji Cruz
| style="background:gold;" | Miss International 2022
Hannah Arnold (Top 15)

Miss Grand International 2021
Samantha Alexandra Panlilio (Unplaced)

Miss Intercontinental 2021
Cinderella Faye Obeñita (Winner)

The Miss Globe 2021
Maureen Ann Montagne (Winner)

Miss Cosmoworld 2022Meiji Cruz (Winner)|
|-
!2020
|Binibining Pilipinas Grand InternationalSamantha Mae Bernardo(Appointed)
|
| style="background:#FFFF66;" |Miss Grand International 2020 Samantha Mae Bernardo (1st Runner-Up)
|
|-
!2019
|Miss Universe PhilippinesGazini Christiana Jordi GanadosBinibining Pilipinas InternationalBea Patricia MagtanongBinibining Pilipinas SupranationalResham SaeedBinibining Pilipinas Grand InternationalSamantha Ashley Lo(Resigned)
Maria Andrea Abesamis(Assumed title, replacing Lo)Binibining Pilipinas IntercontinentalEmma Mary TiglaoBinibining Pilipinas GlobeLeren Mae Bautista
|1st Runner-Up Maria Andrea Abesamis(Assumed Bb. Pilipinas–Grand International 2019)
Samantha Mae Bernardo(Replaced Abesamis; Appointed Bb. Pilipinas–Grand International 2020)2nd Runner-UpSamantha Mae Bernardo(Assumed 1st Runner-Up)
| style="background:#FFFF66;" |
Miss Universe 2019 
Gazini Christiana Jordi Ganados (Top 20)

Miss International 2019
Bea Patricia Magtanong (Top 8)

Miss Supranational 2019
Resham Saeed (Top 25)

Miss Grand International 2019
Samantha Ashley Lo (Unplaced)

Miss Intercontinental 2019
Emma Mary Tiglao (Top 20)

The Miss Globe 2019
Leren Mae Bautista (2nd Runner-Up)
|
|-
! 2018
|Miss Universe Philippines 
Catriona GrayBinibining Pilipinas InternationalMaria Ahtisa ManaloBinibining Pilipinas SupranationalJehza Mae HuelarBinibining Pilipinas Grand InternationalEva Psychee PatalinjugBinibining Pilipinas IntercontinentalKaren Juanita GallmanBinibining Pilipinas GlobeMichele Theresa Gumabao
|1st Runner-Up Vickie Marie Milagrosa Rushton2nd Runner-UpSamantha Mae Bernardo
| style="background:gold;" | Miss Universe 2018Catriona Gray (Winner)Miss International 2018
Maria Ahtisa Manalo (1st Runner-Up)

Miss Supranational 2018
Jehza Mae Huelar (Top 10)

Miss Grand International 2018
Eva Psychee Patalinjug (Unplaced)Miss Intercontinental 2018Karen Juanita Gallman (Winner)The Miss Globe 2018
Michele Theresa Gumabao (Top 15)
| 
|-
! 2017
|Miss Universe Philippines 
Rachel Louise PetersBinibining Pilipinas International 
Maria Angelica De LeonBinibining Pilipinas Supranational 
Chanel Olive ThomasBinibining Pilipinas Grand International 
Elizabeth ClenciBinibining Pilipinas Intercontinental 
Katarina Sonja RodriguezBinibining Pilipinas Globe 
Nelda Dorothea Ibe
|1st Runner-Up  
Charmaine Elima2nd Runner-Up 
Kristel Guelos

| style="background:#FFFF66;" |
Miss Universe 2017
Rachel Louise Peters (Top 10)

Miss International 2017
Maria Angelica De Leon (Unplaced)

Miss Supranational 2017
Chanel Olive Thomas (Top 10)

Miss Grand International 2017
Elizabeth Clenci (2nd Runner-Up)

Miss Intercontinental 2017
Katarina Sonja Rodriguez (1st Runner-Up)

The Miss Globe 2017
Nelda Dorothea Ibe (1st Runner-Up)
| 
|-
! 2016
|Miss Universe PhilippinesMaria Mika Maxine MedinaBinibining Pilipinas InternationalKylie VerzosaBinibining Pilipinas SupranationalJoanna Louise EdenBinibining Pilipinas Grand InternationalNicole CordovesBinibining Pilipinas IntercontinentalJennifer Ruth Hammond

 Binibining Pilipinas GlobeNichole Marie Manalo
|1st Runner-Up Angelica Alita2nd Runner-Up Jehza Mae Huelar
| style="background:gold;" |
Miss Universe 2016
Maria Mika Maxine Medina (Top 6)Miss International 2016Kylie Verzosa (Winner)Miss Supranational 2016
Joanna Louise Eden (Top 25)

Miss Grand International 2016
Nicole Cordoves (1st Runner-Up)

Miss Intercontinental 2016
Jennifer Ruth Hammond (Top 15)

The Miss Globe 2016
Nichole Marie Manalo (3rd Runner-Up)
| 
|-
! 2015
|Miss Universe PhilippinesPia WurtzbachBinibining Pilipinas InternationalJanicel LubinaBinibining Pilipinas SupranationalRogelie CatacutanBinibining Pilipinas IntercontinentalChristi Lynn McGarryBinibining Pilipinas TourismAnn Lorraine Colis
(became the first Binibining Pilipinas Globe)
|1st Runner-UpHannah Ruth Sison2nd Runner-UpKimverlyn Suiza
| style="background:gold;" |Miss Universe 2015Pia Wurtzbach (Winner)Miss International 2015
Janicel Lubina (Top 10)

Miss Supranational 2015
Rogelie Catacutan (Top 20)

Miss Intercontinental 2015
Christi Lynn McGarry (1st Runner-Up)The Miss Globe 2015Ann Lorraine Colis (Winner)Miss Grand International 2015
Parul Shah (3rd Runner-Up)
| 
|-
! 2014
|Miss Universe PhilippinesMary Jean LastimosaBinibining Pilipinas InternationalMary Anne Bianca GuidottiBinibining Pilipinas SupranationalYvethe Marie SantiagoBinibining Pilipinas IntercontinentalKris Tiffany JansonBinibining Pilipinas TourismParul Shah
(became the first Binibining Pilipinas Grand International)
| 1st Runner-UpLaura Victoria Lehmann2nd Runner-Up'Hannah Ruth Sison
| style="background:#FFFF66;" |
Miss Universe 2014
Mary Jean Lastimosa (Top 10)

Miss International 2014
Mary Anne Bianca Guidotti (Unplaced)

Miss Supranational 2014
Yvethe Marie Santiago (Top 20)

Miss Intercontinental 2014
Kris Tiffany Janson (2nd Runner-Up)

Miss Tourism Queen International 2014
Parul Shah (Pageant was cancelled)
| 
|-
! 2013
| Miss Universe PhilippinesAriella AridaBinibining Pilipinas InternationalBea Rose SantiagoBinibining Pilipinas SupranationalMutya Johanna DatulBinibining Pilipinas TourismJoanna Cindy Miranda
| 1st Runner-UpPia Wurtzbach
| style="background:gold;" |
Miss Universe 2013
Ariella Arida (3rd Runner-Up)Miss International 2013Bea Rose Santiago (Winner)Miss Supranational 2013Mutya Johanna Datul (Winner)Miss Tourism Queen International 2013
Joanna Cindy Miranda (Top 10)

Miss Grand International 2013
Annalie Forbes (3rd Runner-Up)
| 
|-
! 2012
| Miss Universe PhilippinesJanine Mari TugononBinibining Pilipinas InternationalNicole Cassandra SchmitzBinibining Pilipinas TourismKatrina Jayne Dimaranan
| 1st Runner-UpElaine Kay Moll
(became the first Binibining Pilipinas Supranational)2nd Runner-UpAnnalie Forbes
| style="background:#FFFF66;" |
Miss Universe 2012
Janine Mari Tugonon (1st Runner-Up)

Miss International 2012
Nicole Cassandra Schmitz (Top 15)

Miss Supranational 2012
Elaine Kay Moll (3rd Runner-Up)

Miss Tourism Queen International 2012
Katrina Jayne Dimaranan (Pageant was cancelled)
| 
|-
! 2011
| Binibining Pilipinas UniverseShamcey SupsupBinibining Pilipinas InternationalDianne Elaine NecioBinibining Pilipinas TourismIsabella Angela Manjon
| 1st Runner-UpJanine Mari Tugonon2nd Runner-UpMary Jean Lastimosa
| style="background:#FFFF66;" |
Miss Universe 2011
Shamcey Supsup (3rd Runner-Up)

Miss International 2011
Dianne Elaine Necio (Top 15)

Miss Tourism Queen International 2011
Isabella Angela Manjon (Unplaced)
| 
|-
! 2010
|Binibining Pilipinas UniverseMaria Venus RajBinibining Pilipinas WorldCzarina Catherine GatbontonBinibining Pilipinas InternationalKrista Eileen Kleiner
|1st Runner-UpDianne Elaine Necio2nd Runner-UpHelen Nicolette Henson
| style="background:#FFFF66;" |
Miss Universe 2010
Maria Venus Raj (4th Runner-Up)

Miss World 2010
Czarina Catherine Gatbonton (Unplaced)

Miss International 2010
Krista Eileen Kleiner (Top 15)

| 
|-
! 2009
|Binibing Pilipinas UniversePamela Bianca ManaloBinibining Pilipinas WorldMarie-Ann UmaliBinibining Pilipinas InternationalMelody Adelheid Gersbach
| 1st Runner-UpRichell Angalot2nd Runner-UpRegina Hahn
| style="background:#FFFACD;" |
Miss Universe 2009
Pamela Bianca Manalo (Unplaced)

Miss World 2009
Marie-Ann Umali (Unplaced)

Miss International 2009
Melody Adelheid Gersbach† (Top 15)
| 
|-
! 2008
|Binibing Pilipinas UniverseJennifer BarrientosBinibining Pilipinas WorldDanielle Kirsten Castaño (Replaced San Miguel)
Janina San Miguel (Resigned)Binibining Pilipinas InternationalPatricia Isabel Fernandez
|1st Runner-UpDanielle Kirsten Castaño (Replaced San Miguel)2nd Runner-UpElizabeth Jacqueline Nacuspag
| style="background:#FFFACD;" |
Miss Universe 2008
Jennifer Barrientos (Unplaced)

Miss World 2008
Danielle Kirsten Castaño (Unplaced)

Miss International 2008
Patricia Isabel Fernandez (Top 10)
|

|-
! 2007
|Binibing Pilipinas UniverseAnna Theresa Licaros Binibining Pilipinas WorldMargaret WilsonBinibining Pilipinas InternationalNadia Lee Cien Shami
|1st Runner-UpLeizel Verses2nd Runner-UpAbigail Lesley Cruz
|
Miss Universe 2007
Anna Theresa Licaros (Unplaced)

Miss World 2007
Margaret Wilson (Unplaced)

Miss International 2007
Nadia Lee Cien Shami (Unplaced)
|
|-
! 2006
|Binibing Pilipinas UniverseLia Andrea RamosBinibining Pilipinas WorldAnna Maris IgpitBinibining Pilipinas InternationalDenille Lou Valmonte
|1st Runner-UpRosalyn Sirikit Santiago2nd Runner-UpJeanne Bernadette Bello
|
Miss Universe 2006
Lia Andrea Ramos (Unplaced)

Miss World 2006
Anna Maris Igpit (Unplaced)

Miss International 2006
Denille Lou Valmonte (Unplaced)
|
|-
! 2005
|Binibing Pilipinas UniverseGionna CabreraBinibining Pilipinas WorldCarlene AguilarBinibining Pilipinas InternationalPrecious Lara Quigaman
|1st Runner-UpWendy Valdez
(Binibining Pilipinas Tourism)2nd Runner-Up	
Melanie Ediza
| style="background:gold;" |
Miss Universe 2005
Gionna Cabrera (Unplaced)

Miss World 2005
Carlene Aguilar (Top 15)Miss International 2005Precious Lara Quigaman (Winner)|
|-
! 2004
| Binibing Pilipinas UniverseMaricar BalagtasBinibining Pilipinas WorldMaria Karla BautistaBinibining Pilipinas InternationalMargaret-Ann Bayot
| 1st Runner-UpTracy Ann Javelona2nd Runner-Up	
Princess Jasmine Tiongson
| style="background:#FFFACD;" |
Miss Universe 2004
Maricar Balagtas (Unplaced)

Miss World 2004
Maria Karla Bautista (Top 5)

Miss International 2004
Margaret-Ann Bayot (Top 15)
|
|-
! 2003
|Binibing Pilipinas UniverseCarla Gay BalingitBinibining Pilipinas WorldMaria Rafaela YunonBinibining Pilipinas InternationalJhezarie Javier
|1st Runner-UpKate Sephora Baesa2nd Runner-Up	
Noela Mae Evangelista
| style="background:#FFFACD;" |
Miss Universe 2003
Carla Gay Balingit (Unplaced)

Miss World 2003
Maria Rafaela Yunon (Top 5)

Miss International 2003
Jhezarie Javier (Unplaced)
| 
|-
! 2002
| Binibing Pilipinas UniverseKaren Loren AgustinBinibining Pilipinas WorldKatherine Anne ManaloBinibining Pilipinas InternationalKristine Alzar
|1st Runner-UpMargaret-Ann Bayot2nd Runner-Up	
Maria Lourdes Magno
| style="background:#FFFACD;" |
Miss Universe 2002
Karen Loren Agustin (Unplaced)

Miss World 2002
Katherine Anne Manalo (Top 10)

Miss International 2002
Kristine Alzar (Unplaced)
|
|-
! 2001
|Binibing Pilipinas UniverseZorayda Ruth AndamBinibining Pilipinas WorldGilrhea QuinzonBinibining Pilipinas InternationalMaricarl Tolosa
|1st Runner-UpMichelle Reyes2nd Runner-Up	
Maricar Balagtas
|
Miss Universe 2001
Zorayda Ruth Andam (Unplaced)

Miss World 2001
Gilrhea Quinzon (Unplaced)

Miss International 2001
Maricarl Tolosa (Unplaced)
|
|-
! 2000
| Binibing Pilipinas UniverseNina Ricci AlagaoBinibining Pilipinas WorldKatherine Annwen de GuzmanBinibining Pilipinas InternationalJoanna Maria Peñaloza
|1st Runner-UpMaria Cristina Tan2nd Runner-Up	
Nicole Hofer
| 
Miss Universe 2000
Nina Ricci Alagao (Unplaced)

Miss World 2000
Katherine Annwen de Guzman (Unplaced)

Miss International 2000
Joanna Maria Peñaloza (Unplaced)
|
|-
! 1999
| Binibing Pilipinas UniverseMiriam Quiambao (Replaced Bautista)
Janelle Bautista (Dethroned)Binibining Pilipinas WorldLalaine Edson (Replaced Quiambao)
Miriam Quiambao (Replaced Bautista)Binibining Pilipinas InternationalGeorgina Anne Sandico (Replaced Edson)
Lalaine Edson (Replaced Quiambao)
|1st Runner-UpMichelle Arcangel2nd Runner-UpJoelle Marie Pelaez
| style="background:#FFFF66;" |
Miss Universe 1999
Miriam Quiambao (1st Runner-Up)

Miss World 1999
Lalaine Edson (Unplaced)

Miss International 1999
Georgina Anne Sandico (Unplaced)
| 
|-
! 1998
| Binibing Pilipinas UniverseJewel May Lobaton (Replaced Silang)
Olivia Tisha Silang (Resigned)Binibining Pilipinas WorldRachel SorianoBinibining Pilipinas InternationalColette Glazer
|1st Runner-UpElsie Sicat (Replaced Lobaton)
Jewel May Lobaton (Replaced Silang)2nd Runner-UpEsabela Cabrera (Replaced Sicat)
Elsie Sicat (Replaced Lobaton)
| style="background:#FFFACD;" |
Miss Universe 1998
Jewel May Lobaton (Unplaced)

Miss World 1998
Rachel Soriano (Unplaced)

Miss International 1998
Colette Glazer (Top 15)
| 
|-
! 1997
|Binibing Pilipinas UniverseAbbygale ArenasBinibining Pilipinas WorldKristine Rachel FlorendoBinibining Pilipinas InternationalSusan Jane Ritter
|1st Runner-UpAbiele Arianne del Moral2nd Runner-UpMarivic Galang
| style="background:#FFFACD;" |
Miss Universe 1997
Abbygale Arenas (Unplaced)

Miss World 1997
Kristine Rachel Florendo (Unplaced)

Miss International 1997
Susan Jane Ritter (Top 15)
| 
|-
! 1996
| Binibing Pilipinas UniverseAileen DamilesBinibining Pilipinas WorldDaisy ReyesBinibining Pilipinas InternationalYedda Marie Kittilstvedt 
|1st Runner-UpMaria Sovietskaya Bacud2nd Runner-UpSonia Santiago
| style="background:#FFFACD;" |
Miss Universe 1996
Aileen Damiles (Unplaced)

Miss World 1996
Daisy Reyes (Unplaced)

Miss International 1996
Yedda Marie Kittilstvedt (Top 15)
| 
|-
! rowspan="2" | 1995
| Binibing Pilipinas UniverseJoanne SantosBinibining Pilipinas WorldReham Snow Tago Binibining Pilipinas InternationalGladys Andre Dueñas
|1st Runner-UpCaroline Pobre2nd Runner-UpMargaret Laing
| style="background:#FFFACD;" |
Miss Universe 1995
Joanne Santos (Unplaced)

Miss World 1995
Reham Snow Tago (Unplaced)

Miss International 1995
Gladys Andre Dueñas (Top 15)
| 
|-
| Binibining Pilipinas Maja InternationalTiffany Cuña
| 1st Runner-UpStephanie Lopez2nd Runner-UpJacqueline Dimalanta
| style="background:#FFFACD;" |
Miss Maja International 1995
Tiffany Cuña (Top 15)
| 
|-
! 1994
|Binibing Pilipinas UniverseCharlene Mae GonzalesBinibining Pilipinas WorldCaroline SubijanoBinibining Pilipinas InternationalAlma ConcepcionBinibining Pilipinas TourismSheila Marie Dizon
|1st Runner-UpAbbygale Arenas2nd Runner-UpEda Calonia
| style="background:#FFFACD;" |
Miss Universe 1994
Charlene Mae Gonzales (Top 6)

Miss World 1994
Caroline Subijano (Top 10)

Miss International 1994
Alma Concepcion (Top 15)
| 
|-
! 1993
|Binibing Pilipinas UniverseMelinda Joanna GallardoBinibining Pilipinas WorldSharmaine Ruffa GutierrezBinibining Pilipinas InternationalSheela Mae SantarinMiss Tourism PilipinasJenette FernandoLook of the Year PilipinasAna Maria Gonzalez
|1st Runner-UpCristina Esguerra2nd Runner-UpMyra Macariola
| style="background:#FFFF66;" |
Miss Universe 1993
Melinda Joanna Gallardo (Ranked 22nd)

Miss World 1993
Sharmaine Ruffa Gutierrez (2nd Runner-Up)

Miss International 1993
Sheela Mae Santarin (Unplaced)
| 
|-
! 1992
| Binibing Pilipinas UniverseElizabeth BerroyaBinibining Pilipinas WorldMarilen EspinoBinibining Pilipinas InternationalJoanne Timothea AlivioBinibining Pilipinas Maja InternationalMarina Pura Benipayo
|1st Runner-UpHazel Huelves2nd Runner-UpMichelle Buan
| 
Miss Universe 1992
Elizabeth Berroya (Unplaced)

Miss World 1992
Marina Pura Benipayo (Unplaced)
Marilen Espino (Did not compete due to illness;replaced by Benipayo)

Miss International 1992
Joanne Timothea Alivio (Unplaced)
| 
|-
! 1991
|Binibing Pilipinas UniverseMaria Lourdes Gonzales (Replaced Abayari)
Anjanette Abayari (Resigned; Replaced by Gonzalez)Binibining Pilipinas InternationalMaria Patricia BetitaBinibining Pilipinas Maja InternationalSelina Manalad (Replaced Gonzalez)
Maria Lourdes Gonzalez (Replaced Abayari)
|1st Runner-UpJenette Fernando (Replaced Manalad)
Selina Manalad (Replaced Gonzalez)2nd Runner-UpAnna Marie Torres (Replaced Fernando)
Jenette Fernando (Replaced Manalad)
| style="background:#FFFACD;" |
Miss Universe 1991
Maria Lourdes Gonzales (Unplaced)

Miss International 1991
Maria Patricia Betita (Top 15)

Miss Maja International 1991
Selina Manalad (Unplaced)
| 
|-
! 1990
| Binibing Pilipinas UniverseGermelina Leah PadillaBinibining Pilipinas InternationalJennifer PingreeBinibining Pilipinas Maja InternationalPrecious Bernadette TongkoBinibining Pilipinas TourismMilagros Javelosa
|1st Runner-UpMutya Laxa2nd Runner-UpLeonor Cueto
| 
Miss Universe 1990
Germelina Leah Padilla (Unplaced)

Miss International 1990
Jennifer Pingree (Unplaced)
| 
|-
! 1989
| Binibing Pilipinas UniverseSara Jane Paez Binibining Pilipinas InternationalLilia Eloisa AndanarBinibining Pilipinas Maja InternationalJeanne Therese HilarioBinibining Pilipinas TourismMarichele CruzBinibining Pilipinas Flower QueenMaria Rita Apostol
|1st Runner-UpSuzanne Fahling2nd Runner-UpMichelle Blardony
| style="background:#FFFACD;" |
Miss Universe 1989
Sara Jane Paez (Unplaced)

Miss Maja International 1989
Jeanne Therese Hilario (2nd Runner-Up)

Miss International 1989
Lilia Eloisa Andanar (Unplaced)
| 
|-
! 1988
| Binibing Pilipinas UniversePerfida LimpinBinibining Pilipinas InternationalMaria Anthea RoblesBinibining Pilipinas Maja InternationalMaria Muriel MoralBinibining Pilipinas TourismMaritoni Judith Daya
|1st Runner-UpAmelia Joy dela Cruz2nd Runner-UpLorna Legaspi
| 
Miss Universe 1988
Perfida Limpin (Unplaced)

Miss International 1988
Maria Anthea Robles (Unplaced)

Miss Maja International 1988
Maria Muriel Moral (Unplaced)

| 
|-
! 1987
|Binibing Pilipinas UniverseGeraldine Edith AsisBinibining Pilipinas InternationalMaria Lourdes EnriquezBinibining Pilipinas Maja InternationalMaria Luisa JimenezBinibining Pilipinas TourismMarie Avon Garcia
|1st Runner-UpAngela Larrazabal2nd Runner-UpRosabelle Adriano
| style="background:#FFFACD;" |
Miss Universe 1987
Geraldine Edith Asis (Top 10)

Miss Maja International 1987
Maria Luisa Jimenez (Top 10)

Miss International 1987
Maria Lourdes Enriquez (Unplaced)
| 
|-
! 1986
| Binibing Pilipinas UniverseVioleta Asela NaluzBinibining Pilipinas InternationalJessie Alice DixsonBinibining Pilipinas Maja InternationalMaria Cristina Recto
|1st Runner-UpCatherina Salazar2nd Runner-UpChristine Bonifacio
| style="background:#FFFACD;" |
Miss Universe 1986
Violeta Asela Naluz (Unplaced)

Miss International 1986
Jessie Alice Dixson (Top 15)

Miss Maja International 1986
Maria Cristina Recto (Unplaced)
| rowspan="3" | 
|-
! 1985
| Binibing Pilipinas UniverseJoyce Ann BurtonBinibining Pilipinas InternationalSabrina Simonette Marie ArtadiMiss Young PilipinasDivina Cristina  AlcalaBinibining Pilipinas Maja InternationalMaria Luisa Gonzales
|1st Runner-UpGlenah Marie Slaton2nd Runner-UpRita Rosanna Biazon
| style="background:#FFFF66;" |
Miss Universe 1985
Joyce Ann Burton (Unplaced)

Miss International 1985
Sabrina Simonette Marie Artadi (Unplaced)

Miss Maja International 1985
Maria Luisa Gonzales (2nd Runner-Up)
|-
! 1984
| Binibing Pilipinas UniverseMaria Desiree VerdaderoBinibining Pilipinas InternationalCatherine Jane BrummittMiss Young PilipinasRachel Anne WolfeBinibining Pilipinas Maja InternationalMaria Villa Bella NachorMiss Press Photography PilipinasMaritoni Judith Daya
|1st Runner-UpCorazon Tierro2nd Runner-UpAnna Mari Lingad
| style="background:#FFFF66;" |
Miss Universe 1984
Maria Desiree Verdadero (3rd Runner-Up)

Miss International 1984
Maria Villa Bella Nachor (Switched pageants with Brummitt; Unplaced)

Miss Maja International 1984
Catherine Jane Brummitt (Switched pageants with Nachor; Top 10)
|-
! 1983
|Binibing Pilipinas UniverseRosita CapuyonBinibining Pilipinas InternationalFlor Eden PastranaMiss Young PilipinasShalymar AlcantaraBinibining Pilipinas Maja InternationalMaria Anna Cadiz
|1st Runner-UpMatea Leah Aurora Tagle2nd Runner-UpRacquel Buenaventura
| style="background:#FFFACD;" |
Miss Universe 1983
Rosita Capuyon (Unplaced)

Miss International 1983
Flor Eden Pastrana (Unplaced)

Miss Young International 1983
Shalymar Alcantara (Top 15)

Miss Maja International 1983
Maria Anna Cadiz (Top 10)
| rowspan="5" | 
|-
! 1982
| Binibing Pilipinas UniverseMaria Isabel LopezBinibining Pilipinas InternationalMaria Adela Lisa ManibogMiss Young PilipinasSharon Georgina HughesBinibining Pilipinas Maja InternationalNanette Cruz
|1st Runner-UpMaria Desiree Verdadero2nd Runner-UpMaria Ana Liza Gino 
| 
Miss Universe 1982
Maria Isabel Lopez (Unplaced)

Miss International 1982
Maria Adela Lisa Manibog (Unplaced)

Miss Maja International 1982
Nanette Cruz (Unplaced)
|-
! rowspan="2" | 1981
|Binibing Pilipinas UniverseMaria Caroline MendozaBinibining Pilipinas InternationalAlice Veronica SacasasBinibining Pilipinas Maja InternationalJosephine Bautista
|1st Runner-UpRosanna Peña2nd Runner-UpMaria Dolores Lopez
| style="background:#FFFACD;" |
Miss Universe 1981
Maria Caroline Mendoza (Unplaced)

Miss International 1981
Alice Veronica Sacasas (Top 15)

Miss Maja International 1981
Josephine Bautista (Unplaced)
|-
| Miss Young PilipinasJoyce Ann Burton
| 1st Runner-UpEvelyne Andrews2nd Runner-UpMonina Catherine Tan3rd Runner-UpElizabeth Williams 4th Runner-UpAngela Cruz
| style="background:#FFFACD;" |
Miss Young International 1981
Joyce Ann Burton (Top 15)
|-
! 1980
| Binibing Pilipinas UniverseMaria Rosario Silayan†Binibining Pilipinas InternationalDiana Jeanne Christine ChiongMiss Young PilipinasMaria Felicidad LuisBinibining Pilipinas Maja InternationalMaria Asuncion Spirig
|1st Runner-UpSusan Africa2nd Runner-UpCelestina Maristela 
| style="background:#FFFF66;" |
Miss Universe 1980
Maria Rosario Silayan† (3rd Runner-Up)

Miss International 1980
Diana Jeanne Christine Chiong (Top 12 Semifinalist)

Miss Young International 1980
Maria Felicidad Luis (4th Runner-Up)

Miss Maja International 1980
Maria Asuncion Spirig (Top 10)
|-
! 1979
| Binibing Pilipinas UniverseCriselda CecilioBinibining Pilipinas InternationalMimilanie MarquezMiss Young PilipinasMaria Teresa CarlsonBinibining Pilipinas Maja InternationalPrincess Ava Quibranza
|1st Runner-UpPerla Salig2nd Runner-UpCatherine Veloso
| style="background:gold;" | 
Miss Universe 1979
Criselda Cecilio (Unplaced)Miss International 1979Mimilanie Marquez (Miss International)Miss Maja International 1979
Princess Ava Quibranza (Top 10)

Miss Young International 1979
Maria Teresa Carlson (Unplaced)
| rowspan="2" | 
|-
! 1978
| Binibing Pilipinas UniverseJennifer CortesBinibining Pilipinas InternationalLuz PolicarpioMiss Young PilipinasAnne Rose BlasBinibining Pilipinas Maja InternationalLigaya Pascual
|1st Runner-UpKathryn Manuel2nd Runner-UpMaria Luisa Montinola
| 
Miss Universe 1978
Jennifer Cortes (Unplaced)

Miss International 1978
Luz Policarpio (Unplaced)

Miss Young International 1978
Anne Rose Blas (Unplaced)

Miss Maja International 1978
Ligaya Pascual (Unplaced)
|-
! 1977
| Binibing Pilipinas–UniverseAnna Lorraine KierBinibining Pilipinas InternationalMaria Cristina AlbertoMiss Young PilipinasDorothy Sue BradleyBinibining Pilipinas Maja InternationalAnnabelle Arambulo
|1st Runner-UpDigna Ramos2nd Runner-UpDiana Jeanne Christine Chiong
| style="background:#FFFF66;" |
Miss Universe 1977
Anna Lorraine Kier (Unplaced)

Miss International 1977
Maria Cristina Alberto (Competed but Withdrew)

Miss Maja International 1977
Annabelle Arambulo (Unplaced)

Miss Young International 1977
Dorothy Sue Bradley (1st Runner-Up)
| 
|-
! 1976
| Binibing Pilipinas UniverseElizabeth de PaduaBinibining Pilipinas InternationalMaria Dolores AscalonMiss Young PilipinasMarilou FernandezBinibining Pilipinas Maja InternationalCynthia Nakpil
|1st Runner-UpCelita de Castro2nd Runner-UpMaricel Quintos
| style="background:#FFFACD;" | 
Miss Universe 1976
Elizabeth de Padua (Unplaced)

Miss International 1976
Maria Dolores Ascalon (Top 15)

Miss Maja International 1976
Cynthia Nakpil (Unplaced)

Miss Young International 1976
Marilou Fernandez (Unplaced)
| rowspan="2" | 
|-
! 1975
| Binibing Pilipinas UniverseRose Marie BrosasBinibining Pilipinas InternationalJaye MurphyMiss Young PilipinasJean SaburitBinibining Pilipinas Maja InternationalAnnette Liwanag
|1st Runner-UpHermenia Nenita Hernandez2nd Runner-UpMaria Luisa Montinola
| style="background:#FFFF66;" |
Miss Universe 1975
Rose Marie Brosas (4th Runner-Up)

Miss International 1975
Jaye Murphy (Top 15)

Miss Maja International 1975
Annette Liwanag (4th Runner-Up)

Miss Young International 1975
Jean Saburit (Unplaced)
|-
! 1974
|Binibing Pilipinas UniverseGuadalupe SanchezBinibining Pilipinas InternationalErlynne BernardezMiss Young PilipinasDeborah EnriquezBinibining Pilipinas Maja InternationalPacita Eduarda Guevara
|1st Runner-UpImelda Cajanding2nd Runner-UpCynthia Villanueva
| style="background:#FFFF66;" |
Miss Universe 1974
Guadalupe Sanchez (Top 12)

Miss International 1974
Erlynne Bernardez (Unplaced)

Miss Maja International 1974
Pacita Eduarda Guevara (3rd Runner-Up)

Miss Young International 1974
Deborah Enriquez (Unplaced)
| 
|-
! 1973
| Binibining Pilipinas UniverseMaria Margarita MoranBinibining Pilipinas InternationalMaria Elena Ojeda Miss Young PilipinasMaria Milagros de la Fuente
|1st Runner-UpMaria Nanette Prodigalidad
(became the first Miss Maja Pilipinas)2nd Runner-UpJoan Salas3rd Runner-UpMercedes Ditas Zabarte4th Runner-UpPacita Rosalinda Yuviengco
| style="background:gold;" |Miss Universe 1973Maria Margarita Moran(Miss Universe)Miss International 1973
Maria Elena Ojeda (4th Runner-Up)

Miss Maja International
Maria Nanette Prodigalidad (1st Runner-Up)

Miss Young International 1973
Maria Milagros de la Fuente (Unplaced)
| rowspan="3" | 
|-
! 1972
| Binibining Pilipinas UniverseArmi Barbara CrespoBinibining Pilipinas InternationalYolanda DominguezMiss Young PilipinasMaria Lourdes VallejoMiss Charming PilipinasMaria Isabel Seva
|1st Runner-UpAna Maria Arambulo2nd Runner-UpMaria Paripola Penson3rd Runner-UpNoa-Noa Labit4th Runner-UpConsuelo Lorena Escalambre
| style="background:#FFFF66;" |
Miss Universe 1972
Armi Barbara Crespo (Top 12)

Miss International 1972
Yolanda Dominguez (2nd Runner-Up)

Miss Young International 1972
Maria Lourdes Vallejo (Top 15)
|-
! 1971
| Binibining PilipinasVida Valentina DoriaBinibining Pilipinas InternationalEvelyn CamusMiss Young PilipinasMaricar Zaldarriaga
|1st Runner-UpMilagros Gutierrez
(became the first Miss Charming Pilipinas)2nd Runner-UpDonna de Guzman3rd Runner-UpConsuelo Lozano4th Runner-UpCarolyn Flores
| style="background:#FFFF66;" |
Miss Universe 1971
Vida Valentina Doria (Unplaced)

Miss International 1971
Evelyn Camus (2nd Runner-Up)

Miss Young International 1971
Maricar Zaldarriaga (Top 15)
|-
! rowspan="2" | 1970
| Binibining PilipinasSimonette de los ReyesBinibining Pilipinas InternationalAurora Pijuan
|1st Runner-UpImelda Pagaspas2nd Runner-UpElizabeth Magbanua3rd Runner-UpAna Maria Caguiat4th Runner-UpLily del Rosario
| style="background:gold;" | 
Miss Universe 1970
Simonette de los Reyes (Unplaced)Miss International 1970Aurora Pijuan (Miss International)| rowspan="2" | 
|-
| Miss Young PilipinasCarmencita Avecilla
|1st Runner-UpAna Maria Caguiat2nd Runner-UpCarolina Anson3rd Runner-UpEva Abesamis4th Runner-UpLily Cortez Venarao
| style="background:#FFFF66;" | Miss Young International 1970
Carmencita Avecilla (2nd Runner-Up)
|-
! 1969
|Binibining PilipinasGloria Maria DiazMiss PhilippinesMargaret Rose Montinola 
|1st Runner-UpNelia Sancho2nd Runner-UpCynthia Quirino3rd Runner-UpMaricar Azaola4th Runner-UpCarmina Gutierrez
| style="background:gold;" |Miss Universe 1969Gloria Maria Diaz(Miss Universe)Miss International 1969
Margaret Rose Montinola (Top 15)
| 
|-
! rowspan="2" | 1968
| Binibining PilipinasRosario Zaragoza
|1st Runner-UpMaria Elena Samson2nd Runner-UpBenigna Rustia3rd Runner-UpTina Artillaga4th Runner-UpGeorgitta Pimentel
| 
Miss Universe 1968
Rosario Zaragoza (Unplaced)
|
|-
| Miss PhilippinesNenita Ramos
|1st Runner-UpFortune Aleta2nd Runner-UpBenigna Rustia3rd Runner-UpBernadette Bayle4th Runner-UpMaria Elena Samson
| style="background:#FFFACD;" | Miss International 1968
Nenita Ramos (Top 15)
|
|-
! rowspan="2" | 1967
| Binibining PilipinasPilar Delilah Pilapil
|1st Runner-UpMaria Luisa Cordova2nd Runner-UpMaria Rica Key3rd Runner-UpMaria Mercedes Uy4th Runner-UpErlinda Stuart
| 
Miss Universe 1967
Pilar Delilah Pilapil (Unplaced)
|
|-
| Miss PhilippinesMargarita Romualdez
|1st Runner-UpTeresita Lastrilla2nd Runner-UpJune Frances Roco3rd Runner-UpEvangeline de Leon4th Runner-UpPatsy Sevilla
| Miss International 1967
Margarita Romualdez (Unplaced)
|
|-
! 1966
| Binibining PilipinasMaria Clarinda Soriano
|1st Runner-UpElizabeth Winsett2nd Runner-UpLillian Elizabeth Carriedo3rd Runner-UpMary Lou Navarro4th Runner-UpJosine Loinas de Tavera
| style="background:#FFFACD;" | Miss Universe 1966
Maria Clarinda Soriano (Top 15)
| rowspan="2" |
|-
! 1965
|Binibining PilipinasLouise Patricia Vail
|1st Runner-UpIsabel Santos(later appointed as Miss Philippines International)2nd Runner-UpSheba Mulok3rd Runner-UpJune Frances Roco4th Runner-UpElvira Gonzalez
| style="background:#FFFACD;" | Miss Universe 1965
Louise Patricia Vail (Top 15)

Miss International 1965
Isabel Santos (Unplaced)
|-
! 1964
| Binibining PilipinasMaria Myrna Panlilio
|1st Runner-UpMilagros Cataag2nd Runner-UpElvira Gonzales
| style="background:gold;" |
Miss Universe 1964
Maria Myrna Panlilio (Unplaced)Miss International 1964Gemma Cruz(Miss International)'|
|-
|}

 International placements	
Color keys

Current franchises
Miss InternationalMiss Philippines (1964-1969), Binibining Pilipinas International (1969–Present)The Miss GlobeBinibining Pilipinas Globe (2015–Present)Former franchises
 Miss Universe Bb. Pilipinas (1964-1971), Bb. Pilipinas -  Universe (1972-2011) and Miss Universe Philippines (2011–2019)Miss Supranational Binibining Pilipinas Supranational (2013–2019)Miss Grand International Binibining Pilipinas Grand International (2013, 2015–2022)Miss Intercontinental Binibining Pilipinas Intercontinental (2014–2022)Miss Tourism International Binibining Pilipinas Tourism (1987–2015)Miss World Binibining Pilipinas World (1992–2010)Miss Maja InternationalBinibining Pilipinas Maja International (1973–1995)Miss Young InternationalBinibining Pilipinas Young International (1970–1985)''

Appointed titleholders
Color keys

Notes

References

External links
 Binibining Pilipinas Official website

Titleholders

Beauty pageants in the Philippines
Lists of women in beauty pageants